Chilean clover is a common name for several plants and may refer to:

Medicago sativa

Trifolium macraei

Flora of Chile